Nick Cook may refer to:

 Nick Cook (cricketer), English cricketer and umpire
 Nick Cook (writer), British defence consultant on issues of climate change, author and former aviation journalist
 Nicky Cook, British boxer
 Nicholas Cook, British musicologist and writer